Stopwatch is a 1970 Soviet drama film directed by Rezo Esadze.

Plot 
The film tells about the famous football player Lavrov, who decides to leave the sport. He spends his last match in an unfamiliar city and meets there a woman with whom he was in love.

Cast 
 Nikolay Olyalin as Sergey Lavrov
 Natalya Antonova as Natalya
 Viktoriya Beskova as Vera
 Liliya Aleshnikova as Tamara (as L. Aleshnikova)
 Irina Kuberskaya as Asya (as I. Kuberskaya)
 Olga Gasparova as Nina (as O. Kobelyeva)
 Oleg Khromenkov as Vasya (as O. Khromenkov)
 Sergey Muchenikov as Misha (as S. Muchenikov)
 Edward Tyshler
 Yuri Khmelnitsky

References

External links 
 

1970 films
1970s Russian-language films
Soviet drama films
1970 drama films